First-seeded Daphne Akhurst and Louie Bickerton defeated the second seeds Sylvia Harper and Meryl O'Hara Wood 6–2, 3–6, 6–2 in the final, to win the women's doubles tennis title at the 1929 Australian Championships.

Miss Akhurst completed her third and last Triple Crown, having won Women's Singles title earlier that day and Mixed Doubles final the day before.

Seeds

  Daphne Akhurst /  Louie Bickerton (champions)
  Sylvia Harper /  Meryl O'Hara Wood (final)
  Kathleen Le Messurier /  Dorothy Weston (semifinals)
  Emily Hood /  Mall Molesworth (semifinals)

Draw

Draw

Notes

 Mother of Ernest Rowe, most likely Flora Rowe.

References

External links
 Source for seedings

1929 in Australian tennis
1929 in women's tennis
1929 in Australian women's sport
Women's Doubles